Kira Bulten (born May 12, 1973 in Elburg, Gelderland) is a former breaststroke swimmer from the Netherlands, who competed for her native country at the 1992 Summer Olympics in Barcelona, Spain. There she was eliminated in the heats of the 100 m and 200 m breaststroke. In the 4×100 m medley relay she finished in eighth position with the Dutch Team, after gaining the bronze medal in the same event at the 1989 (Bonn) and 1991 European Championships (Athens).

References

1973 births
Living people
People from Elburg
Olympic swimmers of the Netherlands
Dutch female breaststroke swimmers
Swimmers at the 1992 Summer Olympics
European Aquatics Championships medalists in swimming
20th-century Dutch women
21st-century Dutch women
Sportspeople from Gelderland